The Garfagnina Bianca is a breed of small domestic sheep from the historic area of the Garfagnana, the mountainous northern part of the province of Lucca, in Tuscany in central Italy. It shares common origins with the Cornella Bianca, Massese and Zerasca. It is one of the forty-two autochthonous local sheep breeds of limited distribution for which a herdbook is kept by the Associazione Nazionale della Pastorizia, the Italian national association of sheep-breeders.

Breed numbers declined drastically in the second half of the twentieth century. In 1961 there were more than 50,000, distributed over much of central Italy; a census in 1983 identified fewer than 50 pure-bred specimens. In 2013 total numbers for the breed were 356.

References

Sheep breeds originating in Italy